Live in San Francisco is a collaborative live album by Ry Cooder and Corridos Famosos released in September 2013 by Nonesuch Records and Perro Verde. The album was recorded in 2011 at the Great American Music Hall in San Francisco, California. Cooder produced Live in San Francisco and recorded with members of Corridos Famosos, which included vocalists Juliette Commagere, Terry Evans, and Arnold McCuller, Joachim Cooder on drums, Robert Francis on bass, Flaco Jiménez on accordion, and the ten-piece Mexican brass band La Banda Juvenil. It was his first live album since Show Time (1977), which Cooder also recorded at the Great American Music Hall with Jiménez and Evans.

Track listing

References

2013 live albums
Albums produced by Ry Cooder
Albums recorded at the Great American Music Hall
Blues albums by American artists
Collaborative albums
Folk albums by American artists
Latin music albums by American artists
Live blues albums
Live folk albums
Live Latin music albums
Live pop rock albums
Live world music albums
Nonesuch Records live albums
Pop rock albums by American artists
Ry Cooder albums
World music albums by American artists